Alistair Begg (born May 22, 1952) is the senior pastor of Cleveland's Parkside Church (located in Bainbridge Township, Geauga County, Ohio), a position he has held since 1983. He is the voice behind the Truth For Life Christian radio preaching and teaching ministry, which broadcasts his sermons daily to stations across North America through over 1,800 radio outlets. He is also the author of several books.

Biography

Begg was born in Glasgow, Scotland in 1952 and still carries a distinctive Scottish accent after years of ministry in the United States. On 2 November 1972, his mother died. Regarding the incident, Begg wrote that "more spiritual progress is made through failure and tears than success and laughter." Begg graduated from the London School of Theology in 1975 and then served eight years in Scotland at Charlotte Chapel in Edinburgh and Hamilton Baptist Church in Lanarkshire.  Begg became senior pastor of Parkside Church, Cleveland, Ohio, in 1983. Begg is a council member of the Alliance of Confessing Evangelicals. He was also educated at Trent University and Westminster Theological Seminary. Among his influences are Martyn Lloyd-Jones, John Stott, Derek Prime, Eric Alexander, Sinclair Ferguson, Dick Lucas, Eric Liddell, Charles Haddon Spurgeon, Jim Elliot, and Hudson Taylor.

He and his wife, Susan, have been married since 1975. They have three married children and 8 grandchildren. Susan is American by birth and Begg himself became a U.S. citizen in 2004.  He remains a proud supporter of his boyhood club, the Glasgow Rangers.

Theological views
Begg believes in the inerrancy and supremacy of Scripture, and in the saving power of Christ alone. He has said that the core belief of Parkside Church is "that Jesus Christ, the Son of God, has died as an atoning sacrifice for our sins, and that to know Him is to know life, both now and forever [...] Jesus Christ is the only Savior, because Jesus is the only one who is qualified to save."  Begg is especially known for compelling oratory and a style of teaching that makes frequent reference to Biblical passages.

Bibliography
What Angels Wish They Knew: The Basics of True Christianity, Moody Publishers (1999)  
Preaching for God's Glory (2000) 
Pathway to Freedom: How God's Laws Guide Our Lives, Crossway Books (2000)  
The Hand of God: Finding His Care in All Circumstances, Moody Publishers (2001)  
On Being a Pastor: Understanding Our Calling and Work, (with Derek Prime) Moody Publishers (2004) 
Made for His Pleasure: Ten Benchmarks of a Vital Faith, Moody Publishers (2005) 
Christmas Playlist: Four songs that bring you to the heart of Christmas, The Good Book Company (2016) 
Name Above All Names, (with Sinclair Ferguson) Crossway Books (2018) 
Pray Big, The Good Book Company (2019) 
Brave By Faith, The Good Book Company (May, 2021) 
Truth For Life: 365 Daily Devotions, Volume 1, The Good Book Company (November, 2021) 
Truth For Life: 365 Daily Devotions, Volume 2, The Good Book Company (October, 2022)

References

External links
Truth For Life Ministry website
Parkside Church

1952 births
Living people
Clergy from Glasgow
American sermon writers
American Calvinist and Reformed ministers
20th-century Scottish Baptist ministers
Christian writers
Westminster Theological Seminary alumni
Alumni of Nottingham Trent University
Alumni of the London School of Theology
People from Bainbridge, Geauga County, Ohio